The Holy Blood of Wilsnack was the name given to three hosts, which survived a fire in 1383 that burned the church and village to the ground. The hosts  were thus seen as miraculous. The relics became the destination of medieval religious pilgrimages to Bad Wilsnack, Germany for nearly two centuries. Revenue from the many pilgrims enabled the town to build the large St. Nicholas' Church (also known as Holy Blood Church) at the site. The hosts were destroyed by reformers in 1558 during the Protestant Reformation.

History
In 1383 a quarrel broke out between one of the knights of the Prignitz, Heinrich von Bülow, known as "Big Head", and the Bishop of Havelberg, Dietrich Man. Von Bülow raided Wilsnack, one of the bishopric's villages, and burned it to the ground. Entering the ruins of his church, the parish priest found that in the Sacrarium on the altar were three consecrated hosts. They were untouched by the fire but stained with blood. Bishop Dietrich acted to consecrate the hosts so as to avoid accidental idolatry, but the central one overflowed with blood before he could pronounce the Words of Consecration.

They became objects of veneration, and miracles began to be attributed to them. So many pilgrims came that they rivalled the numbers of those to Santiago de Compostela.  The revenue that the pilgrims generated, enabled the diocese to build the church of St. Nicholas. Pilgrims paid for tokens made in the shape of three hosts, which they presented as offerings.  Archaeologists in the area continue to find examples of such artefacts.  Some contemporary religious figures criticized the veneration of the hosts, on the grounds that they were fraudulent, or that veneration was theologically unsound as undermining the concept of Christ's glorification in heaven. (This meant that no blood of his could appear on Earth. The appearance of the hosts was also considered to undermine the traditional doctrine of transubstantiation.) The controversy continued for more than a century.

Among the pilgrims to the site was the English mystic Margery Kempe in 1433, who referred to the visit in her The Book of Margery Kempe.  In the 15th century, the Bishop of Havelberg and the Archbishop of Magdeburg mutually excommunicated each other over the controversial issue of the hosts. The "holy blood" of Wilsnack was attacked by the reformer Jan Hus and the University of Erfurt. Cardinal Nicholas of Cusa tried to forbid pilgrimages there. Pope Eugene IV compromised by requiring that a freshly consecrated host be displayed alongside the relics.  The common people persisted in making pilgrimages to see the hosts, which were important objects of devotion until destroyed by Protestant reformers in 1558.

References

 Ludecus, Matthaeus, Historia von der erfindung, Wunderwercken und zerstörung des vermeinten heiligen Bluts zur Wilssnagk: sampt den hierüber und dawider ergangenen schreiben, Wittenberg [Germany] : Clemens Schleich, 1586 [with a woodcut of the shrine].
Walker Bynum, Caroline: Wonderful Blood: Theology and Practice in Late Medieval Northern Germany and Beyond, University of Pennsylvania Press, 2007. 
Walker Bynum, Caroline: "Bleeding Hosts and their Contact Relics in Late Medieval Northern Germany", in The Medieval History Journal 2004, 7, 227

External links

1383 in Europe
14th-century Christianity
Christian pilgrimages
Buildings and structures in Prignitz
History of Brandenburg
Wilsnack, Holy Blood
Holy Blood churches